Ciske the Rat is a 1955 Dutch drama film directed by Wolfgang Staudte, based on the Ciske trilogy by Piet Bakker. The film was remade in 1984 and turned into a popular musical in 2007.

With 2,433,000 viewers it was the most popular Dutch film of all-time until surpassed a few years later by Fanfare. The film was shown at the Venice Film Festival, where it won a Silver Lion of San Marco. It has also received an honorable mention from the Office Catholique Internationale du Cinéma.

A German version has been made with other actors, titled Ciske: Ein Kind braucht Liebe (Ciske: A Child Needs Love).

Plot
The story is set in the Amsterdam of the 30s, and told from the perspective of a teacher named Bruis. The narrative is centered around Cis Vrijmoeth, an oaf who never sees his father, because he is a sailor, and who is neglected by his mother. Time after time he is expelled from school. Only teacher Bruis can really handle and restrain the boy. In an fit of rage and fear, Ciske kills his mother with a knife and is sent to a youth detention center. In the end, his father returns from the sea and decides to take care of him, together with his wife Aunt Jans.

Cast
Dick van der Velde     ...     Ciske
Kees Brusse	... 	teacher Bruis
Jenny Van Maerlant	... 	Ciske's mother
Riek Schagen	... 	Aunt Jans
Lies Franken    	... 	Suus Bruis
Bernhard Droog     ...     Leraar
Rob de Vries	... 	Ciske's father
Cees Laseur	        ... 	Dhr. Van Loon
Paul Steenbergen	... 	Teacher Maatsuyker
Jan Teulings	... 	Henri - friend of Mother
Guus Oster	        ... 	Officier van Justitie
Hans Tiemeyer	... 	Reinders
Joan Remmelts	... 	Kapelaan de Goey
Tjeerd de Vries ....       Jantje Verkerk (bully)
Heidi Schmidt ...         Betje (Ciske's girlfriend)

See also
 Ciske de Rat (1984 film)

References

External links 
 

1955 films
Dutch black-and-white films
1955 drama films
Dutch children's films
Dutch drama films
Films based on Dutch novels
Dutch multilingual films
Films set in Amsterdam
Films shot in Amsterdam
Films set in the 1930s
1950s multilingual films
1950s Dutch-language films